Hypsiprymnodon is a genus of macropods. The sole extant species is Hypsiprymnodon moschatus, the musky rat-kangaroo. The genus includes four known fossil species.

This name was derived from the genus Hypsiprymnus, a synonym for Potorous, and distinguishes this by combining the Ancient Greek , meaning 'tooth'.

Classification
 Family Hypsiprymnodontidae
 Subfamily Hypsiprymnodontinae
 Genus Hypsiprymnodon
 Hypsiprymnodon moschatus, musky rat-kangaroo 
†Hypsiprymnodon bartholomaii 
†Hypsiprymnodon philcreaseri 
†Hypsiprymnodon dennisi 
†Hypsiprymnodon karenblackae 
 Subfamily †Propleopinae

References

Diprotodonts
Extant Chattian first appearances
Mammal genera
Mammal genera with one living species